Freedom Day may refer to any of the following days:

National and international 
 National Religious Freedom Day on 16 January in the United States, to commemorate the adoption of Thomas Jefferson's landmark Virginia Statute for Religious Freedom in 1786
 Freedom Day (Ukraine) on 22 January in Ukraine, anniversary of the signing of the Act Zluky by the Ukrainian People's Republic and the West Ukrainian People's Republic in 1919
 World Freedom Day on 23 January in Taiwan and South Korea to mark the return of ex-communist war prisoners of the Korean War
 National Freedom Day on 1 February in the United States, to honor the signing by Abraham Lincoln of a joint House and Senate resolution that later became the 13th Amendment to the U.S. Constitution
 Freedom Day (Belarus) on 25 March in Belarus, anniversary of the establishment of the Belarusian People's Republic in 1918
 Freedom Day (Malta) on 31 March, anniversary of the withdrawal of British troops from Malta, 1979
 Freedom Day (Portugal) on 25 April, anniversary of Carnation Revolution in Portugal, 1974
 Freedom Day (South Africa) on 27 April, anniversary of the first general election in South Africa after the end of apartheid in 1994
 Freedom Day (Malawi) on 14 June, anniversary of the first free election in Malawi in 1994
 Juneteenth on 19 June in the United States, also known as Freedom Day, commemorating the day in 1865 when Union troops arrived in Galveston, Texas, announcing the end of slavery
 Freedom Day (Equatorial Guinea) on 3 August, a public holiday in Equatorial Guinea
 World Freedom Day (United States) on 9 November in the United States, to commemorate the fall of the Berlin Wall in 1989

Local, regional, informal, other

United States
 Liberation and Freedom Day, 3 March, commemorating the day in 1865 when Union troops arrived in Charlottesville, Virginia, liberating the slaves
 Chicago Public School Boycott of 22 October 1963, also known as Freedom Day
 New York City school boycott of 3 February 1964, also known as Freedom Day

Other 
 An informal name for the anniversary (25 March) of the passage of Slave Trade Act 1807 in the United Kingdom
 Celebration of the Wave Hill walk-off on 23 August, a landmark strike in the history of Indigenous land rights in Australia
 Scientology holidays on 30 December, commemorating the day the religion was officially recognized in the United States
 The fictional holiday celebrated in the episode "A Taste of Freedom" of the animated TV show Futurama
 "Freedom Day" in the United Kingdom, 19 July 2021, on which the last remaining social contact restrictions due to COVID-19 were repealed

See also

 National Day
 Liberation Day
 Revolution Day
 List of national independence days

Types of national holidays